was a Japanese author of children's literature.

He was the author of Usagi no me ("A Rabbit's Eyes") and Taiyo no Ko ("Children of the Sun"), both best-sellers.

Haitani died of esophageal cancer on 23 November 2006, aged 72. According to his wishes, no funeral services were held.

References

External links
 J'Lit | Authors : Kenjiro Haitani | Books from Japan 

1934 births
2006 deaths
Japanese writers
People from Kobe